White Island State Historic Site in Rye, New Hampshire, protects  of White Island and the Isles of Shoals Light, an 1865 lighthouse and keeper's cottage.

Access to White Island is by boat.

References

External links
White Island State Historic Site New Hampshire Department of Natural and Cultural Resources

State parks of New Hampshire
Protected areas of Rockingham County, New Hampshire
Rye, New Hampshire